Vladimir Valeryevich Ivanov (born 10 February 1971) is a Russian politician. He has been a member of the State Duma for United Russia since 2021.

On 24 March 2022, the United States Treasury sanctioned him in response to the 2022 Russian invasion of Ukraine.

References 

Living people
1971 births

21st-century Russian politicians
Eighth convocation members of the State Duma (Russian Federation)
United Russia politicians
People from Stavropol Krai
Russian individuals subject to the U.S. Department of the Treasury sanctions
Russian Presidential Academy of National Economy and Public Administration alumni